Day and Age is the fourth studio album by UK neo-progressive rock group Frost*. It marks the first album without a permanent drummer as a core part of the band. Three different guest drummers contributed drums to complete the album: Pat Mastelotto, Kaz Rodriguez, and Darby Todd. The actor Jason Isaacs also contributed narration on The Boy Who Stood Still.

Track listing 
Disc 1 (Standard edition)
 "Day and Age" – 11:49
 "Terrestrial" – 5:12
 "Waiting for the Lie" – 4:31
 "The Boy Who Stood Still" – 7:33
 "Island Life" – 4:14
 "Skywards" – 4:15
 "Kill the Orchestra" – 9:27
 "Repeat to Fade" – 6:15

Disc 2 (Deluxe edition)
 "Day and Age (Instrumental)" – 11:36
 "Terrestrial (Instrumental)" – 5:13
 "Waiting for the Lie (Instrumental)" – 4:33
 "The Boy Who Stood Still (Instrumental)" – 7:36
 "Island Life (Instrumental)" – 4:05
 "Skywards (Instrumental)" – 4:15
 "Kill the Orchestra (Instrumental)" – 9:27
 "Repeat to Fade (Instrumental)" – 6:09

Personnel
Musicians
Jem Godfrey – keyboards, Chapman Railboard, vocals
John Mitchell – electric guitar, vocals
Nathan King – bass guitar
Pat Mastelotto - drums (Skywards, Repeat to Fade)
Kaz Rodriguez - drums (Day and Age, The Boy Who Stood Still, Island Life)
Darby Todd - drums (Terrestrial, Waiting for the Lie, Kill the Orchestra)

Production
Production and Mixing - Jem Godfrey
Mastering - Peter van 't Riet at FineTune
Photography and Graphic Design - Carl Glover at Aleph Studio
Band Photography - Damien Plinth
Licensing - Inside Out Music
Distribution - Sony Music Entertainment

References

External links
Frost* Main Site

2021 albums
Frost* albums
Inside Out Music albums